IFL Group Inc. is a cargo airline based in Waterford, Michigan, United States. It operates ad hoc cargo services as well as contract charters for FedEx and UPS.

History
The airline was established and started operations as Contract Air Cargo in 1983 and is wholly owned by the IFL Group Inc, operating the Dassault Falcon under part 135 as IFL Group Inc., and the Boeing 727 and Convairs under part 121 as Gulf and Caribbean Cargo. Additionally, IFL Group has purchased four CRJ200s for cargo operations, making IFL the first company in the world to use the CRJ airframe exclusively for cargo operations.

Fleet

The IFL Group fleet consists of the following aircraft (as of January 2021):
1 ATR 42-300F
2 ATR 72-600F
3 Boeing 727-200F
4 Bombardier CRJ-200SF
6 Convair CV-580
5 Convair 5800
5 Dassault Falcon 20

See also
List of airlines of the United States

References

Airlines based in Michigan
Airlines established in 1983
Companies based in Oakland County, Michigan
Cargo airlines of the United States
1983 establishments in Michigan
American companies established in 1983